Gabriel Gadiel Michael Kamagi (born 12 September 1996) is a Tanzanian football player. He plays for Simba SC.

International
He made his Tanzania national football team debut on 10 June 2017 in an AFCON qualifier against Lesotho.

He was selected for the 2019 Africa Cup of Nations squad.

International goals
Scores and results Tanzania's goal tally first.

References

External links
 
 
 Gadiel Kamagi at Footballdatabase

1996 births
People from Tanga, Tanzania
Living people
Tanzanian footballers
Tanzania international footballers
Association football defenders
Azam F.C. players
Young Africans S.C. players
Simba S.C. players
2019 Africa Cup of Nations players
People from Tanga Region
Tanzanian Premier League players